The Albania-American Bektashi Teqe in Michigan  is a Bektashi Sufi tekke located in Taylor, Michigan, United States. It was founded by Baba Rexheb, a Bektashi community leader who had immigrated to the United States from Albania. As the first Bektashi building founded in the United States, the tekke was consecrated on May 15, 1954.

See also
List of Bektashi tekkes and shrines
World Headquarters of the Bektashi
History of the Albanian Americans in Metro Detroit
Islam in Metro Detroit
List of mosques in the United States
Islamic Center of America

References

External links

Facebook

Albanian-American history
European-American culture in Metro Detroit
Mosques in Michigan
Taylor, Michigan
Mosques completed in 1954
Islamic organizations established in 1954
Sufism in the United States
Shia Islam in the United States
Shia mosques in the United States
Islam in Metro Detroit
Bektashi tekkes